Gowri Kalyanam is a 1966 Indian Tamil-language film, directed by K. Shankar and produced by G. V. Saravanan. The film stars Jaishankar, Jayalalitha, Ravichandran, Sheela and Nagesh. It was released on 11 November 1966.

Plot

Cast 

Jaishankar as Raju
Jayalalithaa as Gowri
Ravichandran as Ramu
Sheela as Lakshmi
Nagesh as School teacher
Manorama as Ayyakkanu's wife
Pandari Bai as Kamatchi
S. N. Lakshmi asr Ramu's aunt
S. V. Ramadas as Ayyakannu
V. S. Raghavan as Vedhagiri
K. Vijayan as Kuthalalingam
Karikol Raju as Vaithiyar
Pakoda Kadhar as school student
Master Prabhakar as Ganaprakasam
Dhanaraj
M. A. Ganapathy
Pasupathy
Natarajan
Lakshmi Kumar

Soundtrack 
The music was composed by M. S. Viswanathan.

Reception 
Kalki said that, had many unnecessary scenes been cut and thereby improving the pacing, the film would have been better.

References

External links 
 

1960s Tamil-language films
1966 films
Films directed by K. Shankar
Films scored by M. S. Viswanathan